Nová Bystřice is a town in Jindřichův Hradec District in the South Bohemian Region of the Czech Republic. It has about 3,200 inhabitants. The town centre is well preserved and is protected by law as an urban monument zone.

Administrative parts
Villages and hamlets of Albeř, Artolec, Blato, Hradiště, Hůrky, Klášter, Klenová, Nový Vojířov, Ovčárna, Senotín, Skalka and Smrčná are administrative parts of Nová Bystřice.

Geography
It lies on the border with Austria, close to Austria's northernmost point near Haugschlag.

Nová Bystřice lies in the Javořice Highlands. Most of the municipal territory lies in the nature park called Bohemian Canada.

History

The first written mention of Nová Bystřice is from 1175 when the area was colonized by Knights Hospitaller of the Mailberg commandry, at the behest of the Nuremberg burgrave Conrad II of Raabs. From the 13th to 16th century, Bystřice was a part of Landštejn estate.

With Conrad's death in 1191, the Raabs dynasty became extinct and in 1260 the estates were finally enfeoffed to the Rosenberg family by Margaret of Babenberg, consort of King Ottokar II of Bohemia.

When Ottokar was disseized by King Rudolf I of Germany in 1276, the estates became the personal dominion of Rudolf's daughter Judith of Habsburg, who later became Bohemian Queen. During the reign of John of Bohemia it became a market town. Around the same time it suffered from great famine. The town was burned down by Jan Žižka in 1420. It was rebuilt and since then it has been called Nová ("New") Bystřice. In July 1533 a group of religious reformers killed 40 Catholic monks, along with other Catholics, and destroyed the monastery.

In 1945 the German population was expelled according to the Beneš decrees. During the cold war, the Iron Curtain garrison was located in the town. The village of Mnich, part of Nová Bystřice, was abandoned in 1952 due to its vicinity to the border.

Demographics

Economy
Textile industry was the traditional business activity, however the recent years saw a drop in the demand. Alma Nová Bystřice and Otavan factories finished their operations.

A substantial number of residents work in the agricultural industry. People working in technical and administrative sector usually commute to Jindřichův Hradec. Increasing tourism is leading to the expansion of services (hotels, restaurants) in the town and is an important source of income, especially during summer months.

Transport

In Nová Bystřice is the road border crossing that leads to the village of Grametten.

Nová Bystřice is the endpoint of a narrow-gauge railway to Jindřichův Hradec operated by Jindřichohradecké místní dráhy. During the tourist season, the trains are powered by historic steam engines and offer various entertainment.

Sport
The Monachus golf resort, situated on the town's southwestern edge, is a major attraction for golfers. It consists of 18-hole championship course and nine-hole public golf academy.

Sights

The main landmark of the town square and whole town is Church of Saints Peter and Paul. It was built in 1335.

Nová Bystřice Castle was built on the foundations of a Gothic castle from the 13th century. The eastern wing of today's castle with cellars with barrel vaults and a two-storey Renaissance arcade on the courtyard side have been preserved from the original castle. Today it is privately owned and inaccessible.

The narrow-gauge railway is one of the main tourist attractions. In the railway station there is the Regional Narrow Gauge Museum.

Veteran Museum is the largest museum of American pre-war cars in the Czech Republic.

Twin towns – sister cities

Nová Bystřice is twinned with:
 Heidenreichstein, Austria

References

External links

Official website 
Narrow-gauge railroad 

Cities and towns in the Czech Republic
Populated places in Jindřichův Hradec District